The Columbia Accident Investigation Board (CAIB) was an internal commission convened by NASA to investigate the destruction of the Space Shuttle Columbia during STS-107 upon atmospheric re-entry on February 1, 2003. The panel determined that the accident was caused by foam insulation breaking off from the external fuel tank, forming debris which damaged the orbiter's wing, and that the problem of "debris shedding" was well known but considered "acceptable" by management. The panel also recommended changes that should be made to increase the safety of future shuttle flights. The CAIB released its final report on August 26, 2003.

Major findings
The board found both the immediate physical cause of the accident and also what it called organizational causes.

Immediate cause of the accident

82 seconds after launch a large piece of foam insulating material, the "left bipod foam ramp", broke free from the external tank and struck the leading edge of the shuttle's left wing, damaging the protective carbon heat shielding panels.

During re-entry into the Earth's atmosphere, this damage allowed super-heated gases to enter and erode the inner wing structure which led to the destruction of Columbia. It was the seventh instance of a piece of foam, from this particular area of the external tank, breaking free during launch, and the only instance of structural damage as a result of the breakage.

Organizational cause of the accident
The problem of debris shedding from the external tank was well known and had caused shuttle damage on every prior shuttle flight.  The damage was usually, but not always, minor. Over time, management gained confidence that it was an acceptable risk. NASA decided that it did not warrant an extra EVA for visual inspection, feeling that it would be like a car going down a highway and hitting a Styrofoam cooler.

Board recommendations 

The board made 29 specific recommendations to NASA to improve the safety of future shuttle flights.  These recommendations include:

Foam from external tank should not break free
Better pre-flight inspection routines
Increase quality of images available of shuttle during ascent and on-flight
Recertify all shuttle components by the year 2010
Establish an independent Technical Engineering Authority that is responsible for technical requirements and all waivers to them, and will build a disciplined, systematic approach to identifying, analyzing, and controlling hazards throughout the life cycle of the Shuttle System.

Only two further Space Shuttle missions were allowed to be flown before the implementation of these recommendations.

Shuttle program after the CAIB report
After the CAIB report came out, NASA implemented all recommended changes and flew its first post-Columbia mission in 2005. As part of the CAIB recommendations, the Shuttle carried a 50-foot inspection boom attached to the robot arm, which was used within 24 hours of launch to check the orbiter for damage.  As all but one of the post-Columbia missions were concentrated on the International Space Station, primarily to provide a "safe haven" in the event an orbiter was damaged beyond the normal repair methods, NASA implemented a STS-3xx contingency mission program that could launch a rescue orbiter on short notice, similar to the Skylab Rescue that was planned during the Skylab program.

NASA retired the Space Shuttle fleet on July 21, 2011 after completing the ISS and the final flight and subsequent landing of Atlantis.  The Shuttle's replacement, Orion, was to have consisted of an Apollo-derived spacecraft launched on the Ares I rocket, which would use a Space Shuttle Solid Rocket Booster as its first stage. Orion would not face the dangers of either an O-ring failure (due to the presence of a launch escape system) or shedding foam (as the spacecraft would be launched in a stack configuration). In addition to ferrying crews to the ISS, the Orion spacecraft was (as part of Project Constellation) to allow NASA to return to the Moon.  President Obama signed the NASA Authorization Act 2010 on October 11 which officially brought the Constellation program to an end, replacing it with the Space Launch System (SLS) and Multi-Purpose Crew Vehicle (MPCV) programs to develop the launch vehicle and spacecraft to enable human exploration missions beyond low-Earth orbit.

Board members
Chairman of the board
Admiral Hal Gehman, USN

Board members
Rear Admiral Stephen Turcotte, Commander, Naval Safety Center
Maj. General John Barry, Director, Plans and Programs, Headquarters Air Force Materiel Command
Maj. General Kenneth W. Hess, Commander, Air Force Safety Center
Dr. James N. Hallock, Chief, Aviation Safety Division, U.S. Department of Transportation, Volpe Center
Mr. Steven B. Wallace, Director of Accident Investigation, Federal Aviation Administration
Brig. General Duane Deal, Commander, 21st Space Wing, United States Air Force
Mr. Scott Hubbard, Director, NASA Ames Research Center
Mr. Roger E. Tetrault, Retired Chairman, McDermott International
Dr. Sheila E. Widnall, Professor of Aeronautics and Astronautics and Engineering Systems, MIT
Dr. Douglas D. Osheroff, Professor of Physics and Applied Physics, Stanford University
Dr. Sally Ride, Former astronaut and professor of Space Science, University of California, San Diego
Dr. John Logsdon, Director of the Space Policy Institute, George Washington University

Board support
Ex Officio Member: Lt. Col. Michael J. Bloomfield, NASA Astronaut
Executive Secretary: Mr. Theron M. Bradley Jr., NASA Chief Engineer

Partial list of additional investigators and CAIB support staff

Col Timothy Bair
Col. Jack Anthony
Dr. James P. Bagian
Lt. Col. Richard J. Burgess
Thomas L. Carter
Dr. Dwayne A. Day
Major Tracy Dillinger
Thomas L. Foster
CDR Mike Francis
Howard E. Goldstein
Lt. Col Patrick A. Goodman
Lt. Matthew E. Granger
Ronald K. Gress
Thomas Haueter
Dr. Daniel Heimerdinger
Dennis R. Jenkins
Dr. Christopher Kirchhoff
Dr. Gregory T. A. Kovacs
John F. Lehman
Jim Mosquera
Gary Olson
Gregory Phillips
David B. Pye
Lester A. Reingold
Donald J. Rigali
Dr. James. W. Smiley
G. Mark Tanner
Lt. Col. Wade J. Thompson
Dr. Edward Tufte
Bob Vallaster
Dr. Diane Vaughan, sociologist
Lt. Col. Donald J. White
Dr. Paul D. Wilde
LCDR Johnny R. Wolfe Jr.
Richard W. Russell
Mr. Daniel W. Haros
Dr. Robert E. Green Jr.
Dr. Stuart E. Rogers
Dr. Reynaldo J. Gomez
Michael J. Aftosmis

Source:

See also
 Apollo 204 Review Board (Apollo 1 fire)
 Rogers Commission

References

Sources
 CAIB panel and staff information Retrieved  February 15, 2004
 CAIB Final Report, Volume 1 (August 26, 2003)
 STS-107 Investigation Reference Page
 NASA SLS MPCV Retrieved April 30, 2011

External links
Columbia Accident Investigation Board homepage 
CAIB hearing transcripts
NASA homepage
 
Columbia Accident Investigation Board on C-SPAN

2003 in the United States
Investigation Board
Reports of the United States government